Razia or Raziya may refer to
Razia (name)
Razia Sultan (disambiguation)
Raghuvinte Swantham Raziya, a 2011 Malayalam romantic drama film
Razia's Shadow: A Musical, a 2008 album by Forgive Durden